In military terminology, a base of fire is a supporting force that provides overwatch and covering fire to other advancing units while they are executing fire and movement tactics. A base of fire can be a platoon during company fire and movement, by individual armoured fighting vehicles (esp. tanks) or infantry sections, in platoon fire and movement, or even by fireteams or individual soldiers, in the final stages of an assault.

See also
Bounding overwatch
Center Peel
Overwatch (military tactic)

Force protection tactics
Land warfare
Military terminology